Tarentola fascicularis, also known as Wolfgang's wall gecko or moorish gecko, is a species of gecko. It is native to northern Africa (Tunisia, Libya, and Egypt).

References

Tarentola
Geckos of Africa
Reptiles of North Africa
Fauna of Libya
Fauna of Tunisia
Reptiles described in 1802
Taxa named by François Marie Daudin